Pointe-Platon Ecological Reserve is an ecological reserve in Quebec, Canada. It was established in 1995.

"Pointe Platon" was the name of the Manor House and estate which was occupied by the de Lotbinière family. Pierre-Gustave Joly de Lotbinière (1798-1865) and his wife Julie-Christine Chartier de Lotbinière, 5th seigneuresse of Lotbinière lived at "Pointe Platon" for several years

References

External links
 Official website from Government of Québec

Protected areas of Chaudière-Appalaches
Nature reserves in Quebec
Protected areas established in 1995
1995 establishments in Quebec